The following is a list of pipeline accidents in the United States in 2014. It is one of several lists of U.S. pipeline accidents. See also list of natural gas and oil production accidents in the United States.

This is not a complete list of all pipeline accidents. For natural gas alone, the Pipeline and Hazardous Materials Safety Administration (PHMSA), a United States Department of Transportation agency, has collected data on more than 3,200 accidents deemed serious or significant since 1987.

A "significant incident" results in any of the following consequences:
 fatality or injury requiring in-patient hospitalization
 $50,000 or more in total costs, measured in 1984 dollars
 liquid releases of five or more barrels (42 US gal/barrel)
 releases resulting in an unintentional fire or explosion

PHMSA and the National Transportation Safety Board (NTSB) post incident data and results of investigations into accidents involving pipelines that carry a variety of products, including natural gas, oil, diesel fuel, gasoline, kerosene, jet fuel, carbon dioxide, and other substances. Occasionally pipelines are repurposed to carry different products.

Incidents 
 On January 7, a Colonial Pipeline line leak resulted from equipment failure in Fountain Inn, South Carolina, spilling about 52,000 gallons of petroleum product, of which around 8,000 gallons was not recovered.
 On January 10, a 12-inch PSNC gas transmission pipeline exploded and burned in Asheville, North Carolina. The cause was damage to the pipeline during installation in 2003. There were no injuries, but the costs of property damage was around $825,000.
 On January 29, about 600 people were evacuated from their homes & businesses, after the gas distribution system was over pressurized, in Lansing, Michigan. 
 On February 10, a gas pipeline exploded and burned near Tioga, North Dakota. There were no injuries.
 On February 13, a 30-inch diameter Columbia Gulf Transmission gas pipeline carrying natural gas exploded near Knifley, Kentucky, sending two people to the hospital with injuries, destroying two houses, and alarming residents, who saw flames from miles away. Later, it was determined that Hydrogen embrittlement had caused the pipe failure from when the pipeline was installed in 1965.
 On February 19, a leaking gas main caused a gas build up in a nearby rowhouse, that exploded in Baltimore, Maryland, killing one youth, and seriously injuring another walking by the area. 3 other people had minor injuries. The area on the gas main near the leak had been patched twice in previous months.
 On March 6, contractors working for Shell Oil Company hit Shell's Houston-to-Houma (Ho-Ho) crude oil pipeline near Port Neches, Texas, spilling 364 barrels of crude oil.
 2014 East Harlem gas explosion: On March 12, there was a gas explosion in New York City, New York. NTSB investigators found natural gas in the soil nearby, indicating that the gas leak had existed for a while before the explosion.
 On March 17, a 20-inch Mid-Valley Pipeline Company pipeline failed in Hamilton County, Ohio, spilling about 18,900 gallons of crude oil into an adjacent wildlife preserve. Animals in the area were affected. The cause was environmental cracking.
 On March 18, a 3-inch, half-mile flare waste gas pipeline in a neighborhood in Arvin, California, was discovered leaking, a few blocks from Arvin High School, in a residential area. It had been leaking for as long as two years.
 On March 31, a pipeline running to a Williams Companies LNG storage facility in Plymouth, Washington exploded and sent shrapnel flying that ruptured an LNG storage tank. Nearly 1,000 residents were evacuated and at least five employees at the facility were injured.
 A 12-inch Williams Companies gas pipeline failed at a weld in Moundsville, West Virginia. The following explosion and fire explosion scorched trees over a 2-acre area near Moundsville. Several houses were evacuated as a precaution. There were no injuries reported.
 On April 17, a private excavator accidentally cut a gas line while doing some work in Union Township, Licking County, Ohio. The man suffered second degree burns to the upper portion of his body. There was no damage to any buildings.
 On April 23, an explosion and fire hit a Williams Companies gas processing plant in Opal, Wyoming. All 95 residents of the town were evacuated, and part of US Highway 30 was closed for a time.
 On May 6, Sinclair Oil Corporation pipeline operators detected a pressure drop on a pipeline, with the problem being traced two days later to a leak in Knox County, Missouri. A mixture of gasoline and diesel fuel contaminated soil on a farm.
 On May 12, three workers from Plantation Pipeline inadvertently ruptured their pipeline at a pump station in Anderson County, South Carolina, causing a geyser of gasoline, and spraying the workers with it. There was no fire, but the workers had to be decontaminated at a hospital.
 On May 17, at Port St. John, Florida, Kinder Morgan's 36" Florida Gas Transmission pipeline ruptured, forcing evacuation of seven homes and halting train traffic through Brevard Co. for three hours near the Florida Power & Light plant. Florida Gas Transmission workers searched for a leak when pressure dropped in the line. Homes, vehicle and train traffic were reopened after the remaining gas escaped from the pipe. This pipeline failure caused $177,321 in property damage.
 On June 26, near East Bernard, Texas, a gas pipeline adjacent to a Kinder Morgan gas compressor plant blew out, destroying the roadway and setting a nearby truck on fire just south of Highway 59. Flames as high as 150 feet were shooting out of the pipeline. The focus was on a 27-inch pipeline that sends gasoline to different tank farms along the line.
 On July 10, a vent stack at a Williams Field Services gas pipeline compressor station in Susquehanna County, Pennsylvania caught fire. Only minor damage was reported at other parts of the station.
 On July 23, in Milledgeville, Georgia, Midway Elementary School faculty and staff were evacuated due to a fire, caused by a gas leak at nearby Southern Natural Gas Co. tap station. Fire rescue personnel closed down Highway 441 South for an hour. Due to the amount of pressure, precautionary measures were taken so pipe wouldn't rupture under the road while Southern Natural Gas tried to determine the cause of the leak. "It could be some type of failure in a valve or regulator. Right now we don't know but Southern Natural Gas is looking into it." No injuries were reported.
 On August 4, a Greka 6-inch underground oil pipeline spilled over 1,200 gallons of crude oil south of Orcutt, California. The oil spread out over less than a mile from the leak and did not contaminate the nearby creek.
 On August 12, a mulching machine hit a 12-inch natural gas pipeline in Rusk County, Texas. The operator of the machine was killed in the following explosion.
 On August 20, a Buckeye Partners pipeline leaked, inside their terminal, in Linden, New Jersey. About 5900 gallons of jet fuel were spilled, of which most was recovered. The cause of the leak was from internal corrosion of the line.
 On August 21, four workers were injured in a fire while a crew was performing maintenance on a natural gas pipeline in Garvin County, Oklahoma. The injured workers were treated and released from a hospital, and there was no explosion.
 On September 14, a contract worker performing routine maintenance on a Chevron offshore gas pipeline was killed, and two other workers were injured. The accident occurred 6 miles south of Timbalier Bay off the southeast coast of Louisiana.
 On September 16, more than 500 residents of Benton Township, Michigan, were forced to leave their houses for 10 to 12 hours, after authorities discovered a leak on TransCanada Corporation's 22-inch ANR gas transmission pipeline.
 On September 17, 3 LG&E subcontractors were injured, when a gas main exploded after being hit by equipment during maintenance of the gas main, along a stretch of U.S. 42 in Oldham County, Kentucky. There was no fire. 
 On October 13, a gas transmission pipeline failed near Centerview, Missouri, causing an explosion and massive fire for several hours. There were no injuries.
 On October 14, a Sunoco/Mid-Valley crude oil pipeline ruptured, and spilled about 189,000 gallons of crude oil, in Caddo Parish, Louisiana. Wildlife was killed. The cause of the failure was environmental cracking.
 A 24-inch gas transmission pipeline was hit by excavators on October 23, near Newport, Arkansas. Five nearby houses were evacuated, and two highways and a railroad were closed for a time. There was no fire or injuries.
 On October 28, an 8-inch natural gas condensate pipeline exploded in Monroe County, Ohio. A large fire followed. There were no injuries.
 On December 8, gasoline was discovered leaking from Kinder Morgan Plantation Pipeline in Belton, South Carolina. It was found that the 26-inch pipeline had leaked into a nearby creek. The cause was a failure at a sleeve that was part of an earlier repair. As of April 2015, it was estimated that 369,600 gallons of gasoline had leaked. About 160,500 gallons of gasoline had been recovered and removed.

References 

Lists of pipeline accidents in the United States